The women's doubles competition of the table tennis event at the 2015 Southeast Asian Games was held from 1 to 2 June at the Singapore Indoor Stadium in Singapore.

Schedule

Results

References

External links
 

Women's doubles
Women's sports competitions in Singapore
South